Agrius is a genus of moths in the family Sphingidae. The genus was erected by Jacob Hübner in 1819.

These moths are generally grey with pinkish or yellowish suffusions on the hindwings and stripes on the abdomen.

Species
 Agrius cingulata (Fabricius, 1775), pink-spotted hawk moth (South, Central America), type species for the genus
 Agrius convolvuli (Linnaeus, 1758), convulvulus hawk moth (Eurasia, Africa, Australia) 
 Agrius cordiae Riotte, 1984 (Marshall Islands)
 Agrius godarti (Macleaey, 1826) (Australia)
 Agrius luctifera (Walker, 1865) (Indonesia)
 Agrius rothschildi Kitching & Cadiou, 2000

References

External links
 Picture and distribution of A. luctifera

 
Acherontiini
Moth genera
Taxa named by Jacob Hübner